Boinayel may refer to:

 Boinayel, the Rain Giver; the Taino deity, a Zemi
 WASP-6b (planet), Star Márohu, Constellation Aquarius; an exoplanet named after a Taíno deity.

See also